Pseudocopaeodes is a genus of skipper butterflies in the family Hesperiidae.

Species
Pseudocopaeodes eunus - alkali skipper

References
Natural History Museum Lepidoptera genus database
Pseudocopaeodes at funet

Hesperiini
Hesperiidae genera